Flazm Interactive Entertainment is a Lithuanian video game developer and publisher founded in 2010. It is best known for creating the simulation video games Train Valley and its sequel, Train Valley 2.

History 
Flazm Interactive Entertainment was founded in 2010 in Magnitogorsk, Russia, by Alexey Davydov, Sergey Dvoynikov, and Timofey Shargorodskiy. The main focus of the studio was developing web games. Flazm has created over 30 web games for Kizi and Kongregate which have been played over a billion times.

Flazm's first railroad game, called Railway Valley, was developed by Alexey Davydov in 2008. Four years later, two sequels – Railway Valley 2 and Railway Valley Missions – were released, and development started for Train Valley.

In 2014, Flazm moved their headquarters to Vilnius, Lithuania. On September 16, 2015, the studio released Train Valley on Steam. Relocating to Lithuania also allowed Flazm to work with Lithuanian developer Egis Bachur on Scrap Garden, which was released in 2016.

On December 23, 2016, Flazm announced that Train Valley 2 was in development. On March 29, 2018, Train Valley 2 entered early access, with the game releasing on April 13, 2019.

Games

Web games

Game Reviews 
Daniel Waite at Movies Game and Tech wrote a review of Scrap Garden, "It’s a cute story full of interesting characters and  moments, but it’s old hat. I could have heard this story in any other game and I’d know what to expect. Even though I wasn’t captivated by the storyline, this doesn’t mean I disliked the gameplay."

References

External links 
 

Companies based in Vilnius
Lithuanian companies established in 2010
Russian companies established in 2010
Video game companies established in 2010
 Video game companies of Lithuania
Video game companies of Russia
Video game development companies
Video game publishers